The Ancient and Accepted Scottish Rite Temple in Louisville, Kentucky, also known as the Scottish Rite Temple, is a building completed in 1931. It was listed on the National Register of Historic Places in 1982.

It was deemed "an important example of the pure Neo-classical Revival style. Both the interior and exterior are unaltered and, as such, the building represents one of the finest examples of its type in Louisville."

See also
 National Register of Historic Places listings in Downtown Louisville, Kentucky

References

Clubhouses on the National Register of Historic Places in Kentucky
Neoclassical architecture in Kentucky
Masonic buildings completed in 1931
Masonic buildings in Kentucky
1931 establishments in Kentucky
National Register of Historic Places in Louisville, Kentucky